Coris gaimard, the yellowtail wrasse or African coris, among other vernacular names, is a species of wrasse native to the tropical waters of the central Indian Ocean and the western Pacific Ocean, from Christmas Islands and Cocos Keeling Islands to the Society Islands, Hawaii, and from Japan to Australia. This species can also be found in the aquarium trade and is popular species for display in public aquaria.

This species can reach  in total length, though most do not exceed .  As a juvenile, it is a bright red colour with large, black-margined white spots. As an adult, it has a pink face and fins, with the exception of the tail fin, which is bright yellow. The body is green towards the anterior darkening and decorated with bright blue specks towards the caudal peduncle.  The fish also gains a very bright orange anterior when it grows into adulthood, and has a drastically shaded body in the posterior region that is dotted with very bright blue spots ringed with dark blue.

References

External links

 

gaimard
Fish of Hawaii
Fish described in 1824